Nyctimystes myolae is a species of tree frog in the subfamily Pelodryadinae, endemic to Papua New Guinea.  Scientists observed this frog near the village of Myola village, at 2000 meters above sea level.

This frog is brown in color.  Scientists place it in the same species group as the common big-eyed tree frog, Nyctimystes narinosus.

References

Amphibians described in 2014
Frogs of Asia
myolae